The Bayer designation θ Orionis (Theta Orionis) is shared by several astronomical objects, located near RA  DEC :

 θ1 Orionis (41 Orionis), the Trapezium Cluster, an open star cluster, the Orion OB Association 1d
 θ1 Orionis A (41 Orionis A, HD 37020, V1016 Orionis), a trinary star system
 θ1 Orionis B (41 Orionis B, HD 37021), a quintet star system
 θ1 Orionis B West (COUP 766, MAX 97), an astronomical X-ray source
 θ1 Orionis B East (COUP 778, MAX 101), an astronomical X-ray source
 θ1 Orionis C (41 Orionis C, HD 37022), a binary star system
 θ1 Orionis D (41 Orionis D, HD 37023), a B0.5Vp variable star
 θ1 Orionis E (COUP 732), a spectroscopic binary star system
 θ1 Orionis F, a B8 variable star at 11th magnitude
 θ1 Orionis G (COUP 826, MAX 116), a young stellar object
 θ1 Orionis H (COUP 746, MAX 87), a young stellar object
 θ2 Orionis (43 Orionis)
 θ2 Orionis A (43 Orionis, HD 37041), a spectroscopic trinary
 θ2 Orionis B (HD 37042), a B1V variable star
 θ2 Orionis C (HD 37062), a binary star system

The various components are spread over several arc-minutes in and near the Orion Nebula.

Orionis, Theta
Orion (constellation)